Satino is a village and it is around 286 mi (or 461 km) South-East of Moscow, the country's capital city.

.

References

Rural localities in Tambov Oblast